Clement Hughes Parberry (December 30, 1911 – July 11, 1976) was an American coach and athletic administrator in Idaho, at the College of Idaho in Caldwell and the University of Idaho in Moscow.

Born in Colorado Springs, Colorado, Parberry graduated from Pacific University in Forest Grove, Oregon. After coaching in Gooding, Idaho, he became the athletic director at the College of Idaho in 1938, and its head coach in football, basketball, and baseball.

Parberry served in the U.S. Navy during World War II and the Korean War, rising to the rank of lieutenant commander. After his second tour ended in 1953, he joined the athletic staff at the University of Idaho as head baseball coach and assistant in football and basketball. Previously, the head basketball coach at UI also led the baseball program, but increasing overlap between the seasons led to his hiring, taking over from Charles Finley.

Parberry led the Vandal baseball program for four seasons, then transferred to the physical education department; and Wayne Anderson succeeded him as head coach. Parberry ran the intramural program and retired from the university in 1975; he and his wife Viola and relocated to McCall, where they had owned and operated summer cabins on Payette Lake for decades.

A scholarship at the University of Idaho in physical education is awarded in his honor.

Head coaching record

Football

References

External links
 College of Idaho Athletics – Hall of Fame – Clem Parberry

1911 births
1976 deaths
College men's basketball head coaches in the United States
College of Idaho Coyotes baseball coaches
College of Idaho Coyotes football coaches
College of Idaho Coyotes men's basketball coaches
Idaho Vandals baseball coaches
Idaho Vandals football coaches
Idaho Vandals men's basketball coaches
Pacific Boxers football players
United States Navy officers
United States Navy personnel of World War II
Sportspeople from Colorado Springs, Colorado
Military personnel from Colorado